The Zayyanid capture of Fez was led by Abu Malik Abdulwahid , the Zayyanid King. In the early 15th century Abu Malek ascended to throne of Tlemcen and became the King of the Zayyanid dynasty. He was visited at his court by the Marinid prince Mohammed.

Abu Malik supported the claim of the Marinid prince to the throne of Morocco and provided him with food, money and an army. Abu Malek invaded Morocco and captured Fez and then the rest of Morocco. He installed the Marinid prince Mohammed on the throne of Morocco as a vassal of Tlemcen thereby making Morocco a vassal of the Zayyanids.

References

Medieval Morocco
Medieval Algeria
1411
Zayyanid dynasty